Roger of Ellant was a Christian abbot who is considered blessed by the Catholic Church.

Life

Roger was born in England and flourished in the twelfth century.
He joined the Cistercians in France.
According to Alban Butler,

Notes

Sources

1175 deaths
12th-century Christian saints